The Lagos-Badagry Expressway is the local name for the Nigerian section of the Trans–West African Coastal Highway.
The expressway connects Lagos, Nigeria with Dakar, Senegal.

Extensive reconstruction of the Lagos portion of the expressway began in 2010.
When those renovations are completed the Lagos portion of the expressway will be widened from four lanes to ten lanes for road vehicles and a new mass transit line will operate in the median.  Two of the expressway's lanes are intended to be exclusively used by the Lagos Bus Rapid Transit System.

References

Roads in Lagos
Highways in Nigeria